Alan Brown (born 10 September 1980 in Dundee, Scotland) is a former Scotland Club XV international rugby union player for Glasgow Warriors, who played at the Tighthead Prop position, although he could also be used in the Back Row if necessitated. Alan also went on to be a very successful coach after his player and assistant coach days. In 2018 he moved to Strathmore RFC, and in his first season they won the league and gained promotion as well as the quarter finals of the Scottish cup. Alan then returned to Dundee rugby as head coach for the latter 2020 season. The team competes in the Scottish National League Division One.

Rugby Union career

Amateur career

From school, Brown joined the amateur side Morgan Academy RFC.

Brown has been at Dundee HSFP since he was 18.

Professional career

He was in the Glasgow Warriors squad for season 1999 - 2000. He played three match from the bench one against  Swansea RFC on 25 November 1999.

Called into the Glasgow squad in 2002-03 and named as substitute in the Celtic League match against Connacht Rugby on 21 February 2002 for the match that weekend; he secured a later part-time contract with the Warriors in 2003-04 season and 2004-05 season but only managed bench spots .

International career

He is a former Scotland Under 18, Scotland Under 19, Scotland Under 20 and Scotland Under 21 player.

He played for Scotland Club XV in 2012. He also played for the Barbarians

Coaching career

In 2014 he became player-coach at Dundee HSFP, assisting Head Coach Colin Robertson. During 2018-2020 he was head coach at Strathmore RFC. As of 2020 he is back at Dundee 1st XV

References 

1980 births
Living people
Scottish rugby union coaches
Scottish rugby union players
Glasgow Warriors players
Dundee HSFP players
Barbarian F.C. players
Scotland Club XV international rugby union players
Rugby union players from Dundee